Prior to the 1960–61 St. Louis Hawks season owner Ben Kerner changed coaches despite reaching the 1960 NBA Finals. Ed Macauley was replaced with Paul Seymour. On the court, rookie Lenny Wilkens was averaging 11.7 points per game in his first year. The brunt of the scoring came from the Hawks' front line of Bob Pettit, Cliff Hagan, and Clyde Lovellette. They combined for 72.0 points per game, and the Hawks won the West by 15 games. The Hawks finished the season with a record of 51–28. In the playoffs, the Hawks needed a 1-point overtime win in Game 6 on the road to force a 7th game with the Los Angeles Lakers. Game 7 was played in St. Louis and the Hawks beat the Lakers by 2 points. The Hawks then were up against the Boston Celtics in the NBA Finals. The Hawks fell in 5 games as the Celtics won their 4th NBA Title in 5 seasons.

Regular season

Standings

Record vs. opponents

Game log

Playoffs

|- align="center" bgcolor="#ffcccc"
| 1
| March 21
| Los Angeles
| L 118–122
| Bob Pettit (28)
| Bob Pettit (20)
| Kiel Auditorium8,147
| 0–1
|- align="center" bgcolor="#ccffcc"
| 2
| March 22
| Los Angeles
| W 121–106
| Clyde Lovellette (28)
| Bob Pettit (19)
| Kiel Auditorium8,472
| 1–1
|- align="center" bgcolor="#ffcccc"
| 3
| March 24
| @ Los Angeles
| L 112–118
| Bob Pettit (26)
| Bob Pettit (13)
| Los Angeles Memorial Sports Arena5,006
| 1–2
|- align="center" bgcolor="#ccffcc"
| 4
| March 25
| @ Los Angeles
| W 118–117
| Bob Pettit (40)
| Bob Pettit (18)
| Los Angeles Memorial Sports Arena4,923
| 2–2
|- align="center" bgcolor="#ffcccc"
| 5
| March 27
| Los Angeles
| L 112–121
| Cliff Hagan (26)
| Bob Pettit (21)
| Kiel Auditorium
| 2–3
|- align="center" bgcolor="#ccffcc"
| 6
| March 29
| @ Los Angeles
| W 114–113 (OT)
| Bob Pettit (31)
| Bob Pettit (21)
| Los Angeles Memorial Sports Arena14,840
| 3–3
|- align="center" bgcolor="#ccffcc"
| 7
| April 1
| Los Angeles
| W 105–103
| Bob Pettit (31)
| Bob Pettit (17)
| Kiel Auditorium
| 4–3
|-

|- align="center" bgcolor="#ffcccc"
| 1
| April 2
| @ Boston
| L 95–129
| Cliff Hagan (33)
| Cliff Hagan (13)
| Hagan, Sauldsberry (4)
| Boston Garden11,531
| 0–1
|- align="center" bgcolor="#ffcccc"
| 2
| April 5
| @ Boston
| L 108–116
| Cliff Hagan (40)
| Bob Pettit (19)
| Cliff Hagan (6)
| Boston Garden13,909
| 0–2
|- align="center" bgcolor="#ccffcc"
| 3
| April 8
| Boston
| W 124–120
| Bob Pettit (31)
| Bob Pettit (24)
| Si Green (7)
| Kiel Auditorium8,468
| 1–2
|- align="center" bgcolor="#ffcccc"
| 4
| April 9
| Boston
| L 104–119
| Bob Pettit (40)
| Bob Pettit (18)
| Cliff Hagan (7)
| Kiel Auditorium10,442
| 1–3
|- align="center" bgcolor="#ffcccc"
| 5
| April 11
| @ Boston
| L 112–121
| Bob Pettit (24)
| Pettit, Sauldsberry (11)
| Johnny McCarthy (6)
| Boston Garden13,909
| 1–4
|-

Awards and honors
Bob Pettit, All-NBA First Team

References

Hawks on Basketball Reference

St. Louis
Atlanta Hawks seasons
St. Louis Hawks
St. Louis Hawks